Adabrock, is a village in the area of Ness, Lewis, in the Outer Hebrides, Scotland. Adabrock is within the parish of Barvas, and is situated on the B8015 between Lionel and Eorodale. It is at the northern tip of Lewis, south-west of Port of Ness.

The Adabrock Hoard of late Bronze Age tools and weapons was discovered at Adabroc.

References

External links

Canmore - Lewis, Adabrock site record
Canmore - Lewis, Eorodale, Chain Home Low Radar Station site record

Villages in the Isle of Lewis